The following is the List of University of Michigan legislator alumni. For more alumni, see the List of University of Michigan alumni, and details about the University of Michigan.

Where the date or fact of graduation is uncertain, "(MDNG)" is used to indicate "matriculated, did not graduate."

Legislator A
J. Leroy Adair (LAW: JD 1911), a Congressional Representative from Illinois
Edward Payson Allen (LAW: JD 1867), a Congressional Representative from Michigan
Gideon Winans Allen (LAW: 1864), Wisconsin State Assemblyman
John Beard Allen (LAW: 1869?), a Delegate from the Territory of Washington and a Senator from Washington
Leo Elwood Allen (AB 1923), a Congressional Representative from Illinois
Justin Amash (LAW: JD 2005), a Congressional Representative from Michigan's 3rd congressional district
Clinton Presba Anderson (AB ??), a Congressional Representative and a Senator from New Mexico
Daniel Read Anthony, Jr. (MDNG?), a Congressional Representative from Kansas
Henry Fountain Ashurst (MDNG), a Senator from Arizona

Legislators B
Donald Allen Bailey (BA 1967), a Congressional Representative from Pennsylvania
Joseph Edward Baird (LAW: JD 1893), a Congressional Representative from Ohio
Lucien Baker (LAW: JD), a Senator from Kansas
Bert Andrew Bandstra (AB 1953), a Congressional Representative from Iowa
Henry Towne Bannon (AB 1889), a Congressional Representative from Ohio
Samuel Willard Beakes (LAW: JD 1883), a Congressional Representative from Michigan
Rand Beers (MA 1970)
Alvin Morell Bentley (AB 1940, MA 1963), served as vice consul and secretary with the United States Diplomatic Corps in Mexico
Michael D. Bishop (A.B. 1989), State of Michigan Senate Majority Leader
Roswell Peter Bishop (1868-1872) (LAW: JD 1875), a Congressional Representative from Michigan
William Wallace Blackney (LAW: JD 1912), a Congressional Representative from Michigan
Melvin Morella Boothman (LAW: JD 1871), a Congressional Representative from Ohio
William Patterson Borland (LAW: JD 1892), a Congressional Representative from Missouri
Samuel Myron Brainerd, a Congressional Representative from Pennsylvania
Abraham Lincoln Brick (LAW: JD 1883), a Congressional Representative from Indiana
William McNulty Brodhead (LAW: JD 1967), a Congressional Representative from Michigan
Marriott Brosius (LAW), a Congressional Representative from Pennsylvania
Arthur Brown (LAW: JD 1864), a Senator from Utah
Charles Bruce Brownson (AB 1935), a Congressional Representative from Indiana
Ferdinand Brucker (LAW: JD 1881), a Congressional Representative from Michigan
William John Bulow (LAW: JD 1893), a Senator from South Dakota
Anson Burlingame (MDNG? 1838-1841), a Congressional Representative from Massachusetts

Legislators C to E
Benjamin Taylor Cable (AB 1876), a Congressional Representative from Illinois
Martha Hughes Cannon (MED: 1880), on November 3, 1896, became the first woman elected as a state senator in the United States
William Randolph Carpenter (LAW: JD 1917), a Congressional Representative from Kansas
William Wallace Chalmers (AB 1887), a Congressional Representative from Ohio
Walter Marion Chandler (AB 1897), a Congressional Representative from New York
John Logan Chipman (1843-1845), a Congressional Representative from Michigan
Ralph Edwin Church (AB 1907), a Congressional Representative from Illinois
Robert Henry Clancy (AB 1907, LAW: DNG?), a Congressional Representative from Michigan
Kit Francis Clardy (LAW: JD 1925), a Congressional Representative from Michigan
Raymond Francis Clevenger (LAW: JD 1952), a Congressional Representative from Michigan
George Pierre Codd (AB 1891), a Congressional Representative from Michigan
Don Byron Colton (LAW: 1905), a Congressional Representative from Utah
George Hamilton Combs, Jr. (MDNG), a Congressional Representative from Missouri
Solomon Gilman Comstock (MDNG), a Congressional Representative from Minnesota
Michael Francis Conry (LAW: JD 1896), a Congressional Representative from New York
Allen Foster Cooper (LAW: JD 1888), a Congressional Representative from Pennsylvania
Royal Samuel Copeland (MED: MD 1889), a Senator from New York
John Kissig Cowen (LAW: ??), a Congressional Representative from Maryland
William Elijah Cox (LAW: JD 1889), a Congressional Representative from Indiana
Louis Convers Cramton (LAW: JD 1899), a Congressional Representative from Michigan
Philip Miller Crane (MDNG), a Congressional Representative from Illinois
Fred Lewis Crawford, a Congressional Representative from Michigan
George William Crockett, Jr. (LAW: JD 1934), a Congressional Representative from Michigan
Maurice Edgar Crumpacker (LAW: JD 1909), elected as a Congressional Representative to the Sixty-ninth and Seventieth Congresses
Shepard J. Crumpacker, Jr. (LAW: JD 1941), a Congressional Representative from Indiana
Paul Harvey Cunningham (LSA: AB 1914; LAW: JD 1915), a Congressional Representative from Iowa
Gilbert Archibald Currie (LAW: JD 1905), a Congressional Representative from Michigan
Byron M. Cutcheon (AB 1861, LAW: JD 1866), a Congressional Representative from Michigan
Archibald Bard Darragh (1857-1858, AB 1868), a Congressional Representative from Michigan
Cushman Kellogg Davis (AB 1857), a Senator from Minnesota
Stephen Albion Day (AB 1905), a Congressional Representative from Illinois
Marion De Vries (LAW: JD 1888), a Congressional Representative from California
John Richard Dellenback (LAW: JD 1949), a Congressional Representative from Oregon
Gerrit John Diekema (LAW: JD 1883), a Congressional Representative from Michigan
Charles Coles Diggs, Jr. (1940-1942), a Congressional Representative from Michigan
Francis Henry Dodds (LAW: JD 1880), a Congressional Representative from Michigan
Sheridan Downey (LAW: JD 1907), elected as a Democrat to the United States Senate
Robert Blackford Duncan (LAW: LLB 1948), a Congressional Representative from Oregon
Warren Joseph Duffey (LAW: JD 1911), a Congressional Representative from Ohio
Robert F. Ellsworth (LAW: JD 1949), a Congressional Representative from Kansas
Marvin Leonel Esch (AB, MA 1951, Ph. D 1957), a Congressional Representative from Michigan
Robert Emory Evans (LAW: JD 1886), a Congressional Representative from Nebraska

Legislators F to G
John Franklin Farnsworth, a Congressional Representative from Illinois
Homer Samuel Ferguson (AB 1913), a Senator from Michigan
Woodbridge N. Ferris (MED: MD 1874), a Senator from Michigan
Peter G. Fitzgerald (LAW: JD 1986), a Senator from Illinois
George Ford (LAW: JD 1869), a Congressional Representative from Indiana
Gerald Rudolph Ford, Jr. (AB 1935), a Congressional Representative from Michigan, Vice President, and thirty-eighth President of the United States
Harold Ford, Jr. (LAW: JD 1996), a Congressional Representative from Tennessee
Hiram Robert Fowler (LAW: JD 1884), a Congressional Representative from Illinois
Louis Frey, Jr. (LAW: JD 1961), a Congressional Representative from Florida
Frank Ballard Fulkerson (LAW: MDNG), a Congressional Representative from Missouri
Harry Conrad Gahn (LAW: JD 1904), a Congressional Representative from Ohio
John James Gardner (LAW: 1866, 1867), a Congressional Representative from New Jersey
Richard Andrew Gephardt (LAW: JD 1965), a Congressional Representative from Missouri
Ernest Willard Gibson (LAW: 1899), a Congressional Representative and a Senator from Vermont
Joseph John Gill (LAW: JD 1868), a Congressional Representative from Ohio
Paul Gillmor (LAW: JD 1964), a Congressional Representative, Ohio 5th
Paul Eugene Gillmor (LAW: JD 1964), a Congressional Representative from Ohio
Robert Henry Gittins (LAW: JD 1900), a Congressional Representative from New York
Dan Glickman (BA History 1966), a Congressional Representative from Kansas
James Stephen Golden (LAW: LLB 1916), a Congressional Representative from Kentucky
Stephen Goldsmith (LAW: JD 1971), Mayor of Indianapolis 1992-99; US Army Reserve 1968–74
James William Good (LAW: JD 1893), a Congressional Representative from Iowa
William Gordon (LAW: JD 1893), a Congressional Representative from Ohio
James Sedgwick Gorman (LAW: JD 1876), a Congressional Representative from Michigan
Jim Graham (LAW: JD), a Democrat representing Ward 1
Levi Thomas Griffin (AB 1857, LAW:), a Congressional Representative from Michigan
Robert Paul Griffin (LAW: JD 1950), a Congressional Representative and a Senator from Michigan
Martha Wright Griffiths (LAW: JD 1940), a Congressional Representative from Michigan

Legislators H to J
William Flavius Lester Hadley (LAW: JD 1871), a Congressional Representative from Illinois
John Eugene Harding (AB 1900), a Congressional Representative from Ohio
Darius Dodge Hare (LAW: JD 1964), a Congressional Representative from Ohio
Byron Berry Harlan (LAW: JD 1909; LS&A: 1911), a Congressional Representative from Ohio
William H. Harries (LAW: JD 1868), a Congressional Representative from Minnesota
Philip Aloysius Hart (Law: JD 1937), was a Senator from Michigan 
Dow Watters Harter (LAW: JD 1907), a Congressional Representative from Ohio
James Harvey (LAW: LLB 1948), a Congressional Representative from Michigan
Nils Pederson Haugen (LAW: JD 1874), a Congressional Representative from Wisconsin
Walter Ingalls Hayes (LAW: JD 1863), a Congressional Representative from Iowa
Guy T. Helvering (LAW: JD 1906), a Congressional Representative from Kansas
Charles Belknap Henderson (LAW: JD 1895), a Senator from Nevada
John Earl Henderson (LAW: JD 1942), a Congressional Representative from Ohio
Joseph Lister Hill, a Congressional Representative and a Senator from Alabama
William Henry Hinebaugh, a Congressional Representative from Illinois
John Carl Williams Hinshaw (BUS: MDNG), a Congressional Representative from California
Gilbert Monell Hitchcock (LAW: JD 1881), a Congressional Representative and a Senator from Nebraska
Peter Hoekstra (BUS: MBA 1977), a Congressional Representative from Michigan
Adoniram Judson Holmes (LAW: JD 1867), a Congressional Representative from Iowa
Craig Hosmer (MDNG), a Representative from California
Jay Abel Hubbell (AB 1853), a Congressional Representative from Michigan
William Leonard Hungate (MDNG), a Congressional Representative from Missouri
J. Edward Hutchinson (AB 1936, LAW: JD 1938), a Congressional Representative from Michigan
Orange Jacobs (MDNG?), a Delegate from the Territory of Washington
Albert Webb Jefferis (LAW: JD 1893), a Congressional Representative from Nebraska
Adna Romulus Johnson (LAW: JD 1887), a Congressional Representative from Ohio
Bartel John Jonkman (LAW: JD 1914), a Congressional Representative from Michigan

Legislators K
Marcia Carolyn "Marcy" Kaptur (MA 1974), a Congressional Representative from Ohio
Nancy Kassebaum (AB 1954), a Senator from Kansas
Frank Bateman Keefe (LAW: JD 1910), a Congressional Representative from Wisconsin
Edwin William Keightley (LAW: JD 1865), a Congressional Representative from Michigan
Patrick Henry Kelley (LAW: JD 1900), a Congressional Representative from Michigan
Joseph Morgan Kendall (MDNG), a Congressional Representative from Kentucky
Mark Kennedy (BUS: MBA 1983), a Congressional Representative in the U.S. Congress from Minnesota
John Worth Kern (LAW: JD 1869), a Senator from Indiana
Winfield Scott Kerr (LAW: JD 1879), a Congressional Representative from Ohio
Dale Kildee (MA 1962), a U.S. Congressional Representative 
Carolyn Cheeks Kilpatrick (MS 1977), a Congressional Representative from Michigan
Henry Mahlon Kimball (LAW: JD 1904), a Congressional Representative from Michigan
Moses Pierce Kinkaid (LAW: JD 1876), a Congressional Representative from Nebraska
Snyder Solomon Kirkpatrick, a Congressional Representative from Kansas
Milton Kraus (LAW: JD 1886), a Congressional Representative from Indiana

Legislators L
James Laird (LAW: JD 1871), a Congressional Representative from Nebraska
Frederick Landis (LAW: JD 1895), a Congressional Representative from Indiana
Oscar John Larson (LAW: JD 1894), a Congressional Representative from Minnesota
Steven C. LaTourette (BA 1976), a Congressional Representative from Ohio
Scott Leavitt (MDNG?), a Congressional Representative from Montana
John Camillus Lehr (LAW: JD 1900), a Congressional Representative from Michigan
John Jacob Lentz (AB 1882), a Congressional Representative from Ohio
Elliott Harris Levitas (LAW: 1954-1955), a Congressional Representative from Georgia
William Lewis (MDNG), a Congressional Representative from Kentucky
Roland Victor Libonati (AB 1921; LAW: ??), a Congressional Representative from Illinois
Charles August Lindbergh (LAW: JD 1883), a Congressional Representative from Minnesota
Cyrus Locher (LAW: MDNG), a Senator from Ohio
Oren Ethelbirt Long (AB 1916), a Senator from Hawaii
Alfred Lucking (LAW: JD 1878), a Congressional Representative from Michigan

Legislators M
Verner Wright Main (LAW: JD 1914), a Congressional Representative from Michigan
Carl Edgar Mapes (LAW: 1899), a Congressional Representative from Michigan
Ernest Whitworth Marland (LAW: JD 1893), a Congressional Representative from Oklahoma
Eben Wever Martin (LAW: 1879, 1890), a Congressional Representative from South Dakota
William Cotter Maybury (AB 1870; LAW: 1871), a Congressional Representative from Michigan
James Henry Mays (LAW: JD 1895), a Congressional Representative from Utah
Porter James McCumber (LAW: JD 1880), a Senator from North Dakota
Jonas Hartzell McGowan (AB 1861), a Congressional Representative from Michigan
Robert John McIntosh (LAW: JD 1948), a Congressional Representative from Michigan
James Campbell McLaughlin (AB 1879, LAW: JD 1883), a Congressional Representative from Michigan
Rolla Coral McMillen (LAW: JD 1906), a Congressional Representative from Illinois
George Meader (AB 1927; LAW: JD 1931), a Congressional Representative from Michigan
Rice William Means (LAW: JD 1901), a Senator from Colorado
Carrie P. Meek (M.S. 1948), member of the Florida state house of representatives, a Congressional Representative 
George de Rue Meiklejohn (LAW: JD 1880), a Congressional Representative from Nebraska
David Henry Mercer (LAW: JD 1882), a Congressional Representative from Nebraska
William Smith Mesick (LAW: JD 1881), a Congressional Representative from Michigan
Earl Cory Michener (LAW: 1901-1902, DNG), a Congressional Representative from Michigan
Seth Crittenden Moffatt (LAW: JD 1863), a Congressional Representative from Michigan
James William Murphy (LAW: JD 1880), a Congressional Representative from Wisconsin

Legislators N to O
Lucien Norbert Nedzi (BA 1948; LAW: JD 1951), a Congressional Representative 1952
James Carson Needham (LAW: JD 1889), a Congressional Representative from California
John Stoughton Newberry (AB 1847), was appointed the first provost marshal for the State of Michigan
Edward Thomas Noonan (LAW: 1883?), a Congressional Representative from Illinois
Charles Gibb Oakman (AB 1926), a Congressional Representative from Michigan
James Grant O’Hara (AB 1954, LAW: JD 1955), a Congressional Representative from Michigan
John Henry O’Neall (LAW: JD 1864), a Congressional Representative from Indiana
Theobald Otjen (LAW: JD 1875), a Congressional Representative from Wisconsin
James W. Owens (LAW: 1864-1865), a Congressional Representative from Ohio

Legislators P to Q
Jasper Packard (AB 1955), a Congressional Representative from Indiana
Thomas Witherell Palmer (MDNG), Senator from Michigan
Seymour Howe Person (AB 1901), a Congressional Representative from Michigan
Samuel Ritter Peters (LAW: JD 1867), a Congressional Representative from Kansas
Augustus Herman Pettibone (AB 1859), a Congressional Representative from Tennessee
William Wallace Phelps (AB 1846), a Congressional Representative from Minnesota
John Alfred Pickler (LAW: JD 1872), a Congressional Representative from South Dakota
Walter Marcus Pierce (MDNG?), a Congressional Representative from Oregon
Frank Plumley, a Congressional Representative from Vermont
John Edward Porter (LAW: JD 1961), a Congressional Representative from Illinois
Robert Jones "Rob" Portman (LAW: JD 1984), a lawyer and the junior United States senator from Ohio
Tom Price (BA 1976; MED: MD 1979), a Congressional Representative from Georgia
Joseph Very Quarles (AB 1966; LAW: JD 1867), a Senator from Wisconsin

Legislators R
Clark T. Randt (BA, MED: MD), U.S. Congressman
Henry Augustus Reeves (MDNG), a Congressional Representative from New York
John Birchard Rice (MED: 1857), a Congressional Representative from Ohio
Donald Wayne Riegle, Jr. (AB 1960), a Congressional Representative and a Senator from Michigan
Dick Riordan (LAW: JD 1956), Mayor of Los Angeles 1993-2001
Lynn Nancy Rivers (BA 1987), a Congressional Representative from Michigan
Mike Rogers (MDNG), Congressional Representative, Michigan 8th
Philip Edward Ruppe (MDNG 1944-1946), a Congressional Representative from Michigan
Jon Daniel Runyan, 2010 Congressional Representative for

Legislators S
Ken Salazar (LAW: JD 1981), a Senator from Colorado, Secretary of the Interior
John J. H. (Joe) Schwarz (BA 1959), a Congressional Representative from Michigan 	
Frank Douglas Scott (LAW: JD 1901), a Congressional Representative from Michigan
John Franklin Shafroth (AB 1875), a Congressional Representative and a Senator from Colorado
William Graves Sharp (LAW: JD 1881), a Congressional Representative from Ohio
John M. C. Smith (AB 1879, LAW: JD 1880), a Congressional Representative from Michigan
Samuel William Smith (LAW: JD 1878), a Congressional Representative from Michigan
Horace Greeley Snover (AB 1969; LAW: JD 1871), a Congressional Representative from Michigan
Neil Oliver Staebler (BA 1926), a Congressional Representative from Michigan
Robert Theodore Stafford, a Congressional Representative and a Senator from Vermont
Ozora P. Stearns (AB 1858, LAW: JD 1860), a Senator from Minnesota
K. William Stinson (AB 1952), a Congressional Representative from Washington
Byron Gray Stout (AB 1851), a Congressional Representative from Michigan
George Sutherland, a Congressional Representative and a Senator from Utah
Edwin Forrest Sweet (LAW: JD 1874), a Congressional Representative from Michigan
Oscar William Swift (AB: ca 1895?), a Congressional Representative from New York

Legislators T
John Charles Tarsney (LAW: JD 1869), a Congressional Representative from Missouri
Timothy Edward Tarsney (LAW: JD 1872), a Congressional Representative from Michigan
Edward Thomas Taylor (LAW: JD 1884), a Congressional Representative from Colorado
Charles Spalding Thomas (LAW: JD 1871), a Senator from Colorado
Henry Franklin Thomas (MED: 1868), a Congressional Representative from Michigan
Charles A. Towne (AB 1881), a Congressional Representative and a Senator from Minnesota and a Representative from New York
Charles Elroy Townsend (MDNG), a Congressional Representative and a Senator from Michigan
Jerald F. ter Horst, AB 1947. Gerald Ford's short-term press secretary

Legislators U to Z

Lauren Underwood (BS 2008), a Congressional Representative from Illinois
Frederick Stephen Upton (BA 1975), a Congressional Representative from Michigan
Arthur Hendrick Vandenberg (LAW: 1900-1901), a Senator from Michigan
Guy Adrian Vander Jagt (LAW: JD 1960), a Congressional Representative from Michigan
Bird J. Vincent (LAW: JD 1905), a Congressional Representative from Michigan
Weston Edward Vivian (Ph. D. 1959), a Congressional Representative from Michigan
James Franklin Ware (LAW: 1873), Wisconsin State Assembly and Senate
William Warner (LAW: 1861?), a Congressional Representative and a Senator from Missouri
Thaddeus Francis Boleslaw Wasielewski (BA 1927), a Congressional Representative from Wisconsin
Charles Winfield Waterman (LAW: JD 1889), a Senator from Colorado
Thomas Addis Emmet Weadock (LAW: JD 1873), a Congressional Representative from Michigan
John Stanley Webster (LAW: 1897-1899), a Congressional Representative from Washington
William Walter Wedemeyer (LAW: JD 1895), a Congressional Representative from Michigan
Alvin F. Weichel (MDNG), a Congressional Representative from Ohio
Carl May Weideman (MDNG), a Congressional Representative from Michigan
Adonijah Strong Welch (AB 1846), a Senator from Florida
Benjamin Franklin Welty (AB 1896), a Congressional Representative from Ohio
Charles Stuart Wharton (LAW: 1896), a Congressional Representative from Illinois
Burton Kendall Wheeler (LAW: JD 1905), a Senator from Montana
John Jefferson Whitacre (MDNG), a Congressional Representative from Ohio
John Daugherty White (LAW: JD 1872; MED), a Congressional Representative from Kentucky
Robert Henry Whitelaw (LAW: 1873?), a Congressional Representative from Missouri
Justin Rice Whiting (MDNG: 1863-1865), a Congressional Representative from Michigan
Alexander Wiley (MDNG?), a Senator from Wisconsin
Edwin Willits (AB 1955), a Congressional Representative from Michigan
Edgar Wilson (LAW: JD 1884), a Congressional Representative from Idaho
William Warfield Wilson, a Congressional Representative from Illinois
Thomas Jefferson Wood (LAW: JD 1867), a Congressional Representative from Indiana
William Robert Wood (LAW: JD 1882), a Congressional Representative from Indiana
Rebecca Young (1955), Wisconsin State Assembly

References

External links
University of Michigan Alumni
Famous U-M Alumni
Alumni association of the University of Michigan
UM Alumni Information

University of Michigan legislator alumni
Legislator
Michigan